Arnulf Goksøyr (born 4 July 1963) is a Norwegian politician for the Conservative Party.

He served as a deputy representative to the Parliament of Norway from Møre og Romsdal during the term 2013–2017. In local politics, he became a member of Herøy municipal council in 1995 and has served as mayor since 2003.

References

1963 births
Living people
People from Møre og Romsdal
Deputy members of the Storting
Conservative Party (Norway) politicians
Mayors of places in Møre og Romsdal